William Oliver Rowe (2 February 1931 – 29 September 1992) was an English sound engineer. He won a BAFTA Award for Best Sound in 1985 for The Killing Fields and an Academy Award for Best Sound Mixing for The Last Emperor in 1988. He worked on more than 160 films between 1955 and 1992.

Selected filmography
The Killing Fields (1984)
 The Last Emperor (1987)

References

External links

1931 births
1992 deaths
Best Sound BAFTA Award winners
Best Sound Mixing Academy Award winners
English audio engineers
People from Crook, County Durham